Pseudicius is a genus of the jumping spiders first described by Eugène Simon in 1885. The name is combined of Greek pseudo "false" and the salticid genus name Icius. The small genus Wesolowskana (formerly known as Luxuria) should possibly be included in this genus. There is some dispute whether Afraflacilla is a distinct genus or should be included in Pseudicius. Festucula and Marchena are other close relatives, these genera form a monophyletic group.

Species
, the World Spider Catalog accepted the following species. Many species formerly placed here have been transferred to a variety of other genera.

 Pseudicius adustus Wesołowska, 2006 – Namibia
 Pseudicius africanus Peckham & Peckham, 1903 – South Africa, Lesotho
 Pseudicius amicus Prószyński, 2000 – Middle East
 Pseudicius andamanius (Tikader, 1977) – Andaman Islands
 Pseudicius athleta Wesołowska, 2011 – Uganda, Kenya
 Pseudicius badius (Simon, 1868) – France (Corsica), Italy to Iran
 Pseudicius courtauldi Bristowe, 1935 – Greece to China
 Pseudicius cultrifer Caporiacco, 1948 – Greece (Rhodes)
 Pseudicius dapoensis Barrion, Barrion-Dupo & Heong, 2013 – China
 Pseudicius decemnotatus Simon, 1885 – Singapore
 Pseudicius dentatus Wesołowska & Haddad, 2013 – South Africa
 Pseudicius elmenteitae Caporiacco, 1949 – Kenya
 Pseudicius encarpatus (Walckenaer, 1802) – Europe to Central Asia
 Pseudicius espereyi Fage, 1921 – Greece
 Pseudicius femineus Wesołowska & Haddad, 2013 – South Africa
 Pseudicius flabellus Wesołowska & Haddad, 2013 – South Africa
 Pseudicius ghesquieri (Giltay, 1935) – Congo
 Pseudicius gracilis Haddad & Wesołowska, 2011 – South Africa
 Pseudicius icioides (Simon, 1884) – Sudan
 Pseudicius kaszabi (Żabka, 1985) – Vietnam
 Pseudicius kulczynskii Nosek, 1905 – Greece, Turkey, Syria
 Pseudicius maculatus Haddad & Wesołowska, 2011 – South Africa, Lesotho
 Pseudicius marshi (Peckham & Peckham, 1903) – South Africa
 Pseudicius matabelensis Wesołowska, 2011 – Namibia, Zimbabwe, South Africa
 Pseudicius mirus Wesołowska & van Harten, 2002 – Socotra
 Pseudicius musculus Simon, 1901 – Algeria, South Africa
 Pseudicius oblongus Peckham & Peckham, 1894 – Brazil
 Pseudicius palaestinensis Strand, 1915 – Turkey, Azerbaijan, Israel, Iran
 Pseudicius picaceus (Simon, 1868) – Mediterranean to Azerbaijan
 Pseudicius procerus Wesołowska & Haddad, 2018 – South Africa
 Pseudicius pseudocourtauldi Logunov, 1999 – Armenia
 Pseudicius punctatus (Marples, 1957) – Fiji, Samoa, Caroline Is.
 Pseudicius ridicularis Wesołowska & Tomasiewicz, 2008 – Ethiopia
 Pseudicius sengwaensis Wesołowska & Cumming, 2011 – Zimbabwe
 Pseudicius squamatus Haddad & Wesołowska, 2013 – South Africa
 Pseudicius vankeeri Metzner, 1999 – Greece, Turkey, Cyprus, Israel
 Pseudicius wesolowskae Zhu & Song, 2001 – China
 Pseudicius yunnanensis (Schenkel, 1963) – China
 Pseudicius zabkai Song & Zhu, 2001 – China
 Pseudicius zebra Simon, 1902 – South Africa

References

External links
 Photograph of P. encarpatus
 Photograph of Pseudicius sp.

Salticidae
Salticidae genera
Spiders of Asia
Spiders of Africa
Spiders of Brazil